Gary Byron (born March 26, 1970) is an American politician who served in the Connecticut House of Representatives from the 27th district from 2015 to 2019. In 2019 he was the morning co-host with Brad Davis on WDRC's Talk of Connecticut until taking over as the full time host in 2020.  The rebranded show is titled Mornings With Gary Byron.

References

1970 births
Living people
Republican Party members of the Connecticut House of Representatives